Parah Puneh (also Romanized as Pārāh Pūneh; also known as Qanāt, Para Pīvna, Par Pīūneh, and Pūneh) is a village in Beyranvand-e Jonubi Rural District, Bayravand District, Khorramabad County, Lorestan Province, Iran. At the 2006 census, its population was 166, in 36 families.

References 

Towns and villages in Khorramabad County